The  was a limited express electric multiple unit type operated by Nagoya Railroad (Meitetsu) in Japan from 1984 to 2005. It was used on Panorama DX services.

Formations

Original 2 car sets
The original 2 car trains were formed as follows:

Later 3 car sets
The later 3 car sets, introduced from 15 June 1989, were formed as follows:

The 880x cars with an even number were fitted with one lozenge-type pantograph.

History
The trains started service in 1984 as 2 car units. A third car was inserted between all sets starting from 1989. However, with the decline of tourism related services, the 8800 series were relegated to trans-city expresses. Originally, the fees paid by passengers who took "Panorama DX" trains were higher than those who took "Panorama Super" services; this was later changed so both services had the same fees. As the 8800 series only had a top speed of 110 km/h, compared to the top speed of 120 km/h on "Panorama Super" trains, the 8800 series were slowly taken out of service, with all being withdrawn by late January 2005, and scrapped by March the same year.

The 8800 series was the recipient of the 28th Blue Ribbon Award held in 1985.

Preserved examples
The front half of the cab section of unit 8803 has been preserved at the Maigi inspection yard.

References

External links
 

Electric multiple units of Japan
8800 series
Train-related introductions in 1984

1500 V DC multiple units of Japan
Nippon Sharyo multiple units